Saliniramus fredricksonii  is a species of bacteria from the order of Hyphomicrobiales.

References

Hyphomicrobiales